Paul Joseph Kelly (June 26, 1915 – July 15, 1995) was an American mathematician who worked in geometry and graph theory.

Education and career
Kelly was born in Riverside, California. He earned bachelor's and master's degrees from the University of California, Los Angeles before moving to the University of Wisconsin–Madison for doctoral studies; he earned his Ph.D. in 1942 with a dissertation concerning geometric transformations under the supervision of Stanislaw Ulam.

He spent the rest of the war years serving in the United States Air Force as a First Lieutenant, before returning to academia with a teaching appointment at the University of Southern California in 1946. He moved to the University of California, Santa Barbara in 1949, and was chair there from 1957 to 1962. At UCSB, his students included Brian Alspach (through whom he has nearly 30 academic descendants) and Phyllis Chinn. He retired in 1982.

Contributions
Kelly is known for posing the reconstruction conjecture with his advisor Ulam, which states that every graph is uniquely determined by the ensemble of subgraphs formed by deleting one vertex in each possible way. He also proved a special case of this conjecture, for trees.

He is the coauthor of three textbooks: Projective geometry and projective metrics (1953, with Herbert Busemann), Geometry and convexity: A study in mathematical methods (1979, with Max L. Weiss), and The non-Euclidean, hyperbolic plane: Its structure and consistency (1981, with Gordon Matthews).

Selected articles
with David Merriell:  
with E. G. Straus:

References

1915 births
1995 deaths
20th-century American mathematicians
Graph theorists
University of California, Los Angeles alumni
University of Wisconsin–Madison alumni
University of Southern California faculty
University of California, Santa Barbara faculty
Mathematicians from California